Chorisepalum is a genus of flowering plants belonging to the family Gentianaceae.

Its native range is Guyana Highlands.

Species:

Chorisepalum carnosum 
Chorisepalum ovatum 
Chorisepalum psychotrioides 
Chorisepalum rotundifolium 
Chorisepalum sipapoanum

References

Gentianaceae
Gentianaceae genera